Bombus semenoviellus is a species of insect belonging to the family Apidae.

It is native to Europe.

Description

Range
The species has been invading towards west in recent years. The westernmost location so far is in Lower Saxony; from here eastwards to Tuva, east of this only one report from Panfilov et al. 1961 from Sakha / Yakutia; northwards to southern Norway (first discovered here in 2013 in Hvaler; no evidence from Sweden), in Finland to the Arctic Circle, in Russia to Karelia, Arkhangelsk, Komi and Perm; south to Bavaria, Northern Austria, Slovakia, Ukraine and Orenburg. In Germany, the first record for Central Europe was made in Schleswig-Holstein in 1998 (van der Smissen & Rasmont 2000), in the following years the species was also reported from Brandenburg, Saxony, Thuringia, Saxony-Anhalt, Bavaria, Mecklenburg-Western Pomerania and Lower Saxony. In Austria, a find from 2009 from the Waldviertel in Lower Austria is known to date (Streinzer, 2010).

Habitat
Originally sparse boreal coniferous forests of the southern taiga. Also forest steppe, extensively used grassland, semi-arid grassland, ruderal areas, wet meadows. From the lowlands to the colline altitude. In Central Europe, forest clearings, forest paths and forest edges, but also diverse and flower-rich cultural landscapes such as meadows, ruderal areas, gardens and parks near human settlements with a warm, dry summer character (Frommer 2018).

Ecology
Occurs from late April to late August. Overwintered females appear from the end of April, young males in July. This is a polylectic species. During the summer colony development phase, Asteraceae are preferred as fodder plants. Nests underground in abandoned mouse cauldrons. Pollenstorer. The colonies are not very strong in individuals.

Etymology
Named after the Russian entomologist Andrey Petrovich Semyonov Tyan-Shansky (1866-?), Who collected parts of the type series.

Taxonomy
Subgenus Cullumanabambus VOGT, 1911

References

Apidae